María Elena Alvarado Carrasco (26 June 1954 – 26 December 2013), better known by her stage name Malena Alvarado, was a Venezuelan actress and author, whose career lasted over three decades.

Born in Caracas, Alvarado began her acting career in 1981 and appeared in film, television and stage roles.

Malena Alvarado died of complications following surgery on 26 December 2013, aged 59, in her hometown of Caracas, Capital District.

References

External links

1954 births
2013 deaths
Actresses from Caracas
Venezuelan television actresses
Venezuelan film actresses
Venezuelan stage actresses
Venezuelan expatriates in Colombia
20th-century Venezuelan actresses
21st-century Venezuelan actresses